Nerdist News is a Nerdist-branded pop culture newsletter launched in February 2012. It was founded and operated by Nerdist Industries' CEO, Peter Levin, and its CCO, Chris Hardwick. It was hosted by Jessica Chobot.

Publication
The cross-platform publisher currently has two newsletter publications, Nerdist News and TOKYOPOP powered by Nerdist Industries. The target for the newsletters is socially active consumers of genre fare.

Nerdist 
Comedian Chris Hardwick's Nerdist Industries, entered into an equity partnership with GeekChicDaily in June 2011. Nerdist Industries operates a podcast network, including the flagship Nerdist Podcast, Nerdist Blog and NerdMelt theater at Meltdown Comics in Los Angeles.

In February 2012, GeekChicDaily fully merged with Nerdist Industries and became Nerdist News.

References

External links 
 Nerdist News
 Nerdist

Publishing companies of the United States
Nerdist Industries